Release is the fourth and final album by American noise rock group Cop Shoot Cop, released on September 13, 1994 by Interscope Records.

The group expanded to a quintet with new member Steven McMillen on guitar and trumpet, and keyboardist Jim Coleman shifted from his sample-based approach to more use of convention piano than the group's earlier albums. Trombonist David Ouimet, then of Motherhead Bug, was a guest on two songs. 

Cop Shoot Cop dissolved amid creative disagreement and personal problems while recording their fifth album which was never officially released but demos have been bootlegged. Frontman Tod Ashley quickly formed Firewater, and the other members of Cop Shoot Cop moved on to various musical efforts. Coleman worked solo under the name Phylr, while drummer Phil Puleo became a longtime member of fellow New Yorkers Swans and Jack Natz worked with Lubricated Goat. 

Release went out of print from Interscope in the U.S., but was re-issued by Cleopatra Records in 2014.

Track listing

Personnel

Cop Shoot Cop
Tod Ashley – lead vocals, high-end bass guitar
Jim Coleman – sampler, piano
Steven McMillen – guitar, trumpet
Jack Natz – low-end bass guitar, harmonica, vocals
Phil Puleo – drums, percussion

Production and additional personnel
Martin Bisi – recording (10), mixing (10)
Cop Shoot Cop – production
Edward Douglas – recording (1-9, 11-13)
Suzanne Dyer – mixing (1-9, 11-13)
Greg Gordon – recording, mixing
David Ouimet – trombone (3, 12)
Dave Sardy – production, recording (1-9, 11-13), mixing (1-9, 11-13)
Howie Weinberg – mastering

Release history

References

External links 
 

1994 albums
Cop Shoot Cop albums
Big Cat Records albums
Interscope Records albums
Rough Trade Records albums
Albums produced by Dave Sardy